The 2019 Vietnam Open (officially known as the Yonex-Sunrise Vietnam Open 2019 for sponsorship reasons) was a badminton tournament which took place at Nguyen Du Cultural Sports Club in Ho Chi Minh City, Vietnam, from 10 to 15 September 2019 and had a total purse of $75,000.

Tournament
The 2019 Vietnam Open was the seventh Super 100 tournament of the 2019 BWF World Tour and also part of the Vietnam Open championships, which had been held since 1996. This tournament was organized by the Ho Chi Minh City Badminton Association and sanctioned by the BWF.

Venue
This international tournament was held at Nguyen Du Cultural Sports Club in Ho Chi Minh City, Vietnam.

Point distribution
Below is the point distribution table for each phase of the tournament based on the BWF points system for the BWF Tour Super 100 event.

Prize money
The total prize money for this tournament was US$75,000. Distribution of prize money was in accordance with BWF regulations.

Men's singles

Seeds

 Liew Daren (second round)
 Sourabh Verma (champion)
 Subhankar Dey (second round)
 Kunlavut Vitidsarn (second round)
 Heo Kwang-hee (second round)
 Tanongsak Saensomboonsuk (quarter-finals)
 Lucas Corvée (third round) 
 Chico Aura Dwi Wardoyo (second round)

Finals

Top half

Section 1

Section 2

Bottom half

Section 3

Section 4

Women's singles

Seeds

 Kirsty Gilmour (second round)
 Carolina Marín (first round)
 Saena Kawakami (first round)
 Yvonne Li (second round)
 Zhang Yiman (champion)
 Kim Hyo-min (second round)
 Ayumi Mine (second round)
 Pai Yu-po (second round)

Finals

Top half

Section 1

Section 2

Bottom half

Section 3

Section 4

Men's doubles

Seeds

 Lu Ching-yao / Yang Po-han (quarter-finals)
 Mark Lamsfuß / Marvin Seidel (second round)
 Choi Sol-gyu / Seo Seung-jae (champions)
 Lee Jhe-huei / Yang Po-hsuan (semi-finals)
 Ricky Karanda Suwardi / Angga Pratama (second round)
 Huang Kaixiang / Liu Cheng (first round)
 Ou Xuanyi / Zhang Nan (second round)
 Kang Min-hyuk / Kim Jae-hwan (first round)

Finals

Top half

Section 1

Section 2

Bottom half

Section 3

Section 4

Women's doubles

Seeds

 Della Destiara Haris / Rizki Amelia Pradipta (champions)
 Dong Wenjing / Feng Xueying (second round)
 Émilie Lefel / Anne Tran (first round)
 Liu Xuanxuan / Xia Yuting (second round)
 Natsu Saito / Naru Shinoya (second round)
 Chayanit Chaladchalam / Phataimas Muenwong (quarter-finals)
 Hsu Ya-ching / Hu Ling-fang (first round)
 Miki Kashihara / Miyuki Kato (second round)

Finals

Top half

Section 1

Section 2

Bottom half

Section 3

Section 4

Mixed doubles

Seeds

 Mark Lamsfuß / Isabel Herttrich (second round)
 Marvin Seidel / Linda Efler (quarter-finals)
 Hoo Pang Ron / Cheah Yee See (quarter-finals)
 Lu Ching-yao / Lee Chia-hsin (withdrew)
 Mak Hee Chun / Chau Hoi Wah (semi-finals)
 Lee Jhe-huei / Hsu Ya-ching (final)
 Mathias Christiansen / Alexandra Bøje (first round)
 Adnan Maulana / Mychelle Crhystine Bandaso (second round)

Finals

Top half

Section 1

Section 2

Bottom half

Section 3

Section 4

References

External links
 Tournament Link

Vietnam Open (badminton)
Vietnam Open
Vietnam Open (badminton)
Sport in Ho Chi Minh City
Vietnam Open (badminton)